The Whang Youn Dai Achievement Award is named after South Korean Dr. Whang Youn Dai, who contracted polio at the age of three. She devoted her life to the development of paralympic sport in Korea and around the world. At the 1988 Paralympic Summer Games in Seoul, Korea, the International Paralympic Committee (IPC) recognized her lifelong contributions to the Paralympic Movement and established the Whang Youn Dai Achievement Award (formerly the Whang Youn Dai Overcome Prize). Since then, this award has been presented at every Paralympic Games to one male and one female athlete who each "best exemplify the spirit of the Games and inspire and excite the world".

According to the IPC, "the award is for someone who is fair, honest and is uncompromising in his or her values and prioritizes the promotion of the Paralympic Movement above personal recognition." Six finalists, three female and three male, are selected from participants at the Paralympic Games. Two winners are then selected as recipients of the prize and receive a gold medal at the closing ceremonies of the Games. South African sprint runner Oscar Pistorius was nominated for the award in 2012, but did not win. The IPC decided that from the 2020 Tokyo Paralympics, it will no longer be awarded in the closing ceremony for the Paralympics. Instead, it was replaced by the I'mPOSSIBLE Award, established by the Agitos Foundation and the International Paralympic Committee and supported by the Nippon Foundation Paralympic Support Centre.

Winners

References

External links 
 Official Website

Paralympic Games
Disabled sports awards
Sports trophies and awards